Rats, Lice and History is a 1935 book written by biologist Hans Zinsser on the subject of typhus, a disease on which he performed significant research. Zinsser frames the book as a biography of the infectious disease, tracing its path through history. An important theme of the book is the (according to Zinsser, underappreciated) effect infectious diseases such as typhus had on the course of history, a topic which would later be treated in other popular works such as Plagues and Peoples and Guns, Germs and Steel.

Written for a lay audience, Zinsser's humorous and literate style was well received by readers, and it was widely read on its release, and has since gone through many editions.


Summary 
The book is divided into sixteen chapters. As alluded to in the book's original subtitle, Being a Study in Biography, Which, After Twelve Preliminary Chapters Indispensable for the Preparation of the Lay Reader, Deals with the Life History of Typhus Fever, the proper "biography" of typhus occurs only in the last four chapters.

The first two thirds of the work provide background information on topics such as:
 Scientific concepts and definitions (e.g. Chapter III: "Leading up to the definition of bacteria and other parasites, and digressing briefly into the question of the origin of life", Chapter IV: "On parasitism in general, and on the necessity of considering the changing nature of infectious diseases in the historical study of epidemics")
 Diseases of the ancient world (chapter VI) and their effect on political and military history (chapters VII and VIII)
 The important vectors of typhus mentioned in the title, rats and lice (chapters IX through XI)

Having received a classical education that emphasized liberal arts, Zinsser refers to a number of classical works throughout the text, occasionally quoting passages in Latin, French, and German (without translation).

Reception 
Rats, Lice and History received an overwhelmingly positive critical reception on its release. In his review for The New York Times Book Review, R. L. Duffus wrote that "Dr. Zinsser, without being condescending and with no taint of 'popularization,' has written one of the wisest and wittiest books that have come off the presses in many a long month."
In a front-page review in the New York Herald Tribune Books, physician and medical writer Logan Clendening wrote "It is impossible for me to overpraise this fascinating volume".

Rats, Lice and History was listed by The New York Times as the 8th bestselling nonfiction book of 1935.

Later generations of scientists and physicians such as Emil Frei and Gerald Weissmann have cited Rats, Lice and History as an inspiration for their scientific careers.

References 

1935 non-fiction books
Epidemic typhus
Books about diseases
American non-fiction books
Little, Brown and Company books